Orleans is a cross-platform software framework for building scalable and robust distributed interactive applications based on the .NET Framework or on the more recent .NET.

Overview
Orleans was originally created by the eXtreme Computing Group at Microsoft Research and introduced the Virtual Actor Model as a new approach to building distributed systems for the cloud. Orleans scales from a single on-premises server to highly-available and globally distributed applications in the cloud.

Starting with cloud services for the Halo franchise, the framework has been used by a number of cloud services at Microsoft and other companies since 2011. The core Orleans technology was transferred to 343 Industries and is available as open source since January 2015. The source code is licensed under MIT License and hosted on GitHub.

Orleans runs on Microsoft Windows, Linux, and macOS and is compatible with .NET Standard 2.0 and above.

Features
Some Orleans features include:
 Persistence
 Distributed ACID transactions
 Streams
 Timers & Reminders
 Fault tolerance

Related implementations
The Electronic Arts BioWare division created Project Orbit. It is a Java implementation of virtual actors that was heavily inspired by the Orleans project.

See also

 Distributed computing
 Microsoft Azure
 Google App Engine
 Oracle Cloud

References

Further reading

External links
 
 GitHub - dotnet/orleans: Orleans is a cross-platform framework for building distributed applications with .NET
 Orleans - Virtual Actors - Microsoft Research
 Microsoft Orleans - a worked example - CodeProject

.NET software
Cloud computing
Distributed computing
Free and open-source software
Free software programmed in C Sharp
Microsoft free software
Microsoft Research
Software using the MIT license
2015 software